Nico Beyer (born 22 September 1996) is a German footballer who plays as a centre-back for FC Brandenburg 03.

Career
In the summer of 2018, Beyer moved to 3. Liga club FSV Zwickau on a two-year contract. Beyer made his professional debut for FSV Zwickau in the 3. Liga on 27 October 2018, coming on as a substitute in the 90+2nd minute for Tarsis Bonga in the 0–0 away draw against Wehen Wiesbaden.

References

External links
 Profile at DFB.de
 Profile at kicker.de
 
 Nico Beyer at FuPa

1996 births
Living people
Footballers from Berlin
German footballers
Association football central defenders
Hertha BSC II players
FSV Zwickau players
Berliner AK 07 players
3. Liga players
Regionalliga players